is a Japanese actress. She appeared in many Toei films including Pinky violence films. In 1979, she married sumo wrestler Kurama and retired.

Selected filmography

Film
Shin Harenchi Gakuen (1971)
Wandering Ginza Butterfly (1972)
Female Prisoner 701: Scorpion (1972)
Female Prisoner Scorpion: 701's Grudge Song (1973)
Karate Kiba (1973)
School of the Holy Beast (1974)
Cross the Rubicon! (1975)
Violent Panic: The Big Crash (1976)
Karate Warriors (1976)
Okinawa Jūnen Sensou (1978)

Television
playgirl (1972)
Unmeitōge (1974) as Sasaka
G-Men '75 (1975–79) Guest (ep.13,19,63,71,166,199)
Space Ironman Kyodain (1976)
Monkey (1979) Guest (ep,26)
Hattori Hanzō: Kage no Gundan (1980) Guest (ep,19)

References

External links
 

1952 births
Living people
Singers from Tokyo
Japanese film actresses
Japanese television actresses
Japanese women singers